Andrey Bogdanov (8 June 1958 – 1999) was a Russian swimmer who competed in the 1976 Summer Olympics.

References

1958 births
1999 deaths
Russian male swimmers
Soviet male swimmers
Russian male freestyle swimmers
Olympic swimmers of the Soviet Union
Swimmers at the 1976 Summer Olympics
Olympic silver medalists for the Soviet Union
Medalists at the 1976 Summer Olympics
Olympic silver medalists in swimming
20th-century Russian people